Richard Ian M. Alexander (born 15 September 1981 in Homersfield, Suffolk), nicknamed "Ratman", is an English field hockey player.

Alexander made his international senior debut for the national squad in January 2005 against South Africa. He has represented Great Britain at the 2008 Summer Olympics in Beijing, and England at the 2010 Commonwealth Games. He has 130 England caps and 58 Great Britain caps.

He plays club hockey for Indian Gymkhana in the South Hockey League Premier Division 1. He has also played for Richmond Hockey Club, Hampstead & Westminster, Wimbledon, Surbiton and Loughborough.

Alexander was educated at Town Close School.

He now teaches in at a school named Nottingham High School in Nottingham.

References

External links
 
 
 

1981 births
Living people
English male field hockey players
Alumni of Loughborough University
Field hockey players at the 2006 Commonwealth Games
2006 Men's Hockey World Cup players
Field hockey players at the 2008 Summer Olympics
Field hockey players at the 2010 Commonwealth Games
2010 Men's Hockey World Cup players
Olympic field hockey players of Great Britain
British male field hockey players
People from Waveney District
Loughborough Students field hockey players
Hampstead & Westminster Hockey Club players
Wimbledon Hockey Club players
Surbiton Hockey Club players
Sportspeople from Norwich
Commonwealth Games competitors for England